Eugenio de Llaguno y Amírola (October 15, 1724 – February 10, 1799) was a Spanish politician and writer.

Spanish male writers
People from Álava
1724 births
1799 deaths